Consort Xin or Empress Xin may refer to:

Consorts with the surname Xin
Empress Xin (Zhang Zuo's wife) ( 354)
Empress Xin (Shi Siming's wife) (died 761?)

Consorts with the title Consort Xin
Noble Consort Xin (1737–1764), concubine of the Qianlong Emperor
Consort Xin (Jiaqing) (1783–1822), concubine of the Jiaqing Emperor